Aimophila is a genus of American sparrows. The derivation of the genus name is from aimos/αιμος "thicket" and phila/φιλα "loving".

Some species that were formerly classified in Aimophila are now considered to be in the genus Peucaea.

Species in taxonomic order

References
 
 

 
Bird genera
American sparrows